John White (born 15 June 1973 in Mount Isa, Queensland, Australia) is a former World No. 1 squash player.

Career overview
White finished runner-up at both the World Open and the British Open in 2002. He won the PSA Masters title in 2003 (beating Thierry Lincou in the final 15–8, 17–15, 17–16). He also won the British National Championships in 2004 (beating Lee Beachill in the final 17–16, 17–14, 14–15, 15–8). White reached the World No. 1 ranking in March 2004.

White is known as the hardest hitter of the ball in the sport of squash. Quite frequently, he has achieved speeds of over 165 miles per hour (266 km/h). One of his shots was clocked at 172 miles per hour, a record until 3 October 2011 when Cameron Pilley hit a shot that was recorded at 175 miles per hour. White was brought up in Australia, but represents Scotland in international squash.

In 2007, White was appointed Director of Squash and head squash coach at Franklin & Marshall College in Lancaster, Pennsylvania.  He retired from the PSA tour after losing to James Willstrop in the second round of World Squash Championships in 2008. In 2011, White was appointed as the head coach of the varsity men's and women's squash teams at Drexel University in Philadelphia, Pennsylvania.

World Open final appearances

0 title & 1 runner-up

Major World Series final appearances

British Open: 1 final (0 title, 1 runner-up)

Qatar Classic: 1 finals (0 title, 1 runner-up)

References

External links
 
 
 
 
 
 Article on appointment at Franklin & Marshall College (September 2007) 
 Article on appointment as Head Coach of Men's and Women's varsity squash teams at Drexel University (April 2011)

Scottish male squash players
Australian male squash players
People from Mount Isa
Living people
1973 births
Drexel Dragons squash coaches